Konathukunnu is a town in Thrissur district, Kerala, India. This particular junction is absolutely phenomenon. It has everything like a big town need to be. Panchayat office, (Community) a best Gov. School, several other Institutional Centers, hospitals, pharmacies, Masjid, Shiva Temple, petrol stations, several supermarkets, bakeries and many more. More than 100 bus services reach any part of Kerala. It is between Irinjalakuda and Kodungallur on State Highway 22,  from S.N. Puram (NH 66).

Pin Code :680123
STD Code:0480

Transportation
Nearest airport: Kochin International Airport – 
Nearest railway station: Irinjalakuda (Kallettumkara) –

References

Villages in Thrissur district